Andreas Schato (1539–1603) was a 16th-century German physician, mathematician, astronomer and scientist.

Life
He was born in Torgau in central Germany on 19 August 1539, the son of N. N. Schato (probably Nikolaus). His mother is not known.

From 1555 he studied sciences at the University of Jena. In 1559 he moved to Wittenberg where he encountered Melanchthon in his final year of life. At the university there he studied Liberal Arts, graduating in 1562 as a Master of Philosophy. He then briefly joined the faculty of Philosophy in Wittenberg.

In 1564 he moved to Stargard in north Germany (that region then known as Pomerania but now part of Poland). From here he moved to the larger regional capital of Stettin where he served as Deputy Mayor. Following marriage in Stettin he returned to Wittenberg in 1570, but, unable to rejoin the Philosophy faculty, took to private lecturing. However in 1574 he was appointed Professor of Mathematics at the university. Also beginning medical studies he gained his doctorate in 1578.

In 1581 he became Professor of Physics and in 1592 Professor of Medicine. In this capacity he was knighted by Rudolph II, Holy Roman Emperor.

As an astrologer/astronomer he corresponded with (and possibly met) both Johannes Kepler and Tycho Brahe.

He died in Wittenberg on 17 March 1603. He was buried in the Schlosskirche, Wittenberg on 19 March in the south aisle, close to the grave of Martin Luther.

Family
He married Rebecca Thymaeus in Stettin around 1569. They had three sons and two daughters.

Publications
De Morbis Mesenterii (1578)

References

1539 births
1603 deaths
People from Torgau
16th-century German physicians
Physicians from Saxony